Tilaï ("The Law") is a 1990 award-winning Burkinabé drama film co-written, co-produced, and directed by Idrissa Ouédraogo. It premiered at the 1990 Toronto Festival of Festivals.

Plot
Saga returns to his village after a long absence, and finds that his father has married Nogma, his fiancee, during his leave.  Nogma has become his second wife, and by law, Saga's mother. Saga runs away and builds a straw hut near the village.

Still in love, Saga and Nogma begin an affair, with Nogma telling her parents she is going to visit her aunt, then running to Saga's hut. After the affair is discovered, Saga's father decrees that he must die for dishonoring the family. Nogma's father hangs himself from a tree, and Nogma is disowned by her mother at her father's funeral. Saga's brother Kougri is selected to execute Saga. He pretends to kill Saga so as to restore the family's honor.

Saga and Nogma then run away to another village, and the family falls apart. As Saga and Nogma begin to build a life, Nogma tells Saga that she is pregnant. Meanwhile, Kougri comes to regret his failure to kill Saga. After Saga's birth mother dies, Saga returns to the village, exposing Kougri's failure to carry out his father's orders. Kougri's father tells him he is banished. Kougri then picks up Saga's rifle and shoots him for having brought ruin to the family and his own life. He then walks off into exile and probable death.

Cast
Rasmane Ouedraogo as Saga
Ina Cissé as Nogma
Roukietou Barry as Kuilga
Assane Ouedraogo as Kougri
Sibidou Sidibe as Poko
Moumouni Ouedraogo as Tenga
Mariam Barry as Bore
Seydou Ouédraogo as Nomenaba
Mariam Ouedraogo as Koudpoko
Daouda Porgo as Porgo
Kogre Warma as Maiga
Mamadou Ganame as Ganame
Azeta Porgo as Azeta
Noufou Ouédraogo as The child
Salif Ouedraogo as The peddler
Amade Ganame as Villager
Issaka Porgo as Villager
Moumouni Selinga as Villager
Adma Sidibe as Villager
Boureima Warma as Villager
Fati Ouedraogo as Villager
Madi Derme as Cavalier
Amidou Ouedraogo as Cavalier

Awards
Tilaï won the Jury Grand Prize at the 1990 Cannes Film Festival and the Grand Prize at the 1991 Panafrican Film and Television Festival.

Bibliography
 Tilai (1990), Corndog Chats, 16 February 2013, Adam Kuhn, Access date: 9 May 2022 
 A passion not to be denied, Reelingback, 28 February 2021, Michael Walsh (First publish: 28 June 1991), Access date: 9 May 2022

References

External links

 

1990 films
1990 drama films
Films directed by Idrissa Ouedraogo
More-language films
Films set in Africa
Films set in pre-colonial sub-Saharan Africa
Burkinabé drama films
Cannes Grand Prix winners